Antonio Rosón Pérez (8 June 1911 − 24 April 1986) was a Spanish politician and the first president of the pre-autonomic community of Galicia before reaching its Statute of Autonomy in 1981.

References

Presidents of the Regional Government of Galicia
1911 births
1986 deaths